The Martyr of Calvary is a 1952 Mexican drama film directed by Miguel Morayta about the life of Christ. It was entered into the 1954 Cannes Film Festival.

Cast
 Enrique Rambal - Jesús (as Enrique Rambal Jr.)
 Manuel Fábregas - Judas (as Manolo Fabregas)
 Consuelo Frank - María Madre
 Alicia Palacios - Magdalena
 Miguel Ángel Ferriz - Pedro
 Carmen Molina - Marta
 José María Linares-Rivas - Caifás (as Jose Mª. Linares Rivas)
 Felipe de Alba - Andrés
 Luis Beristáin - Jefe Sinagoga
 Miguel Arenas - José de Arimatea
 Lupe Llaca - Verónica
 Alberto Mariscal - Anás el Joven
 Alfonso Mejía - Marcos
 José Baviera - Poncio Pilatos
 Fernando Casanova - Centurión

References

External links

1952 films
1950s Spanish-language films
1952 drama films
Portrayals of the Virgin Mary in film
Mexican black-and-white films
Films directed by Miguel Morayta
Films about Jesus
Portrayals of Mary Magdalene in film
Cultural depictions of Pontius Pilate
Mexican drama films
1950s Mexican films